Karla Rosa da Silva (born 12 November 1984 in Osasco, São Paulo) is a Brazilian athlete specializing in the pole vault. She competed at the 2013 World Championships in Athletics without reaching the final. She is a multiple regional championships medalist.

Personal bests
She has personal bests of 4.53 metres outdoors (2013) and 4.40 metres indoors (2013).
 Pole vault: 4.53 m –  São Paulo, 11 May 2013

Competition record

References

1984 births
Living people
Brazilian female pole vaulters
Athletes (track and field) at the 2011 Pan American Games
Athletes (track and field) at the 2015 Pan American Games
South American Games gold medalists for Brazil
South American Games bronze medalists for Brazil
South American Games medalists in athletics
Competitors at the 2002 South American Games
Competitors at the 2006 South American Games
Competitors at the 2014 South American Games
Pan American Games athletes for Brazil
Sportspeople from São Paulo (state)
21st-century Brazilian women